Chloro(tetrahydrothiophene)gold(I), abbreviated (tht)AuCl, is a coordination complex of gold. Like the dimethyl sulfide analog, this compound is used as a entry point to gold chemistry. The tetrahydrothiophene ligand is labile and is readily substituted with other stronger ligands.

Preparation
This compound may be prepared by the reduction of tetrachloroauric acid with tetrahydrothiophene:
 

The complex adopts a linear coordination geometry, as is typical of many gold(I) compounds. It crystallizes in the orthorhombic space group Pmc21 with a = 6.540(1) Å, b = 8.192(1) Å, c = 12.794(3) Å with Z = 4 formula units per unit cell. The bromide congener is isostructural.

It is somewhat less thermally labile compared to (Me2S)AuCl, but is still sensitive to temperature and light.

References

Gold(I) compounds
Chlorides
Thiolanes
Chloro complexes
Gold–sulfur compounds
Gold–halogen compounds